This is a list of the Chairpersons of the College Republican National Committee. This list includes those persons who served as national chairman of College Republican National Committee and its predecessor organizations, including the American Republican College League, and the Associated University Republican Clubs. The Chairperson of the College Republican National Committee is elected at the organization's bi-annual meeting. Unlike the organization's Democratic counterpart, the College Republican National Committee is entirely independent of both the Republican National Committee and the Young Republican National Federation.

Chairpersons of the College Republican National Committee

See also
 College Republican National Committee
 Republican National Committee

References

External links
Official website

College Republican chairs
Chairpersons
 
College Republicans chairpersons
College Republicans